Kol Chai is a Haredi and National Religious radio station in Israel established in 1996. The station, based in Bnei Brak, broadcasts six days a week: not on Shabbat.

Frequencies

Contributors

Current
David Lau
Mordechai Lavi
Avraham Yosef

Former
Chaim Walder

See also
List of radio stations in Israel
Media of Israel

References

External links
 

1996 establishments in Israel
Haredi Judaism in Israel
Haredi media
Hebrew-language mass media
Jewish radio
Mass media in Bnei Brak
News and talk radio stations
Radio stations established in 1996
Radio stations in Israel
Religious mass media in Israel